The 1985 Syracuse Orangemen football team represented Syracuse University during the 1985 NCAA Division I-A football season. The team was led by fifth-year head coach Dick MacPherson and played their home games in the Carrier Dome in Syracuse, New York. Syracuse finished with a 7–5 record and played in the 1985 Cherry Bowl against Maryland, where they lost, 18–35.

Notable players included Tim Green, who earned unanimous All-American honors at defensive tackle and was a finalist for the Lombardi Award. Green was drafted 17th overall in the 1986 NFL Draft, ending his career at Syracuse as the school's all-time leader in sacks with 45.5, a record that he still owns.

Schedule

Sources:

References

Syracuse
Syracuse Orange football seasons
Syracuse Orangemen football